Per Hållberg (born March 24, 1978 in Örnsköldsvik, Sweden) is a Swedish professional ice hockey player currently playing for Växjö Lakers Hockey of the Elitserien (SEL). Hållberg has played over 500 games in the Elitserien. He has won both the Swedish Championship and the World Championship one time each.

Playing career
Hållberg started his career with his hometown club, Modo Hockey, as a child and made his debut in Elitserien for Modo in 1994–95 at the age of 17. He played a few games in 1994–95 and 1995–96, but in 1996–97 he became a regular.
 
In 1999 Hållberg played his first Swedish Championship final, but Modo lost to Brynäs IF. The following season Modo came to the finals once again, but lost again, this time to Djurgårdens IF. Two years later Modo once more came to the finals, but once again they lost, Färjestads BK won with 3–0 in a best-of-five series.
Now Hållberg was tired of silver and seconds places and he decide to change club. He therefore signed with Färjestad, the same club that had defeated him a few months earlier. With no better luck than before, Färjestad made it to the finals but lost three consecutive finals, twice (2003 and 2005) to Frölunda HC and once (2004) against HV71.

In 2004 Hållberg represented Sweden in the World Championship. Sweden lost in the finals to Canada.

During the 2005–06 season Hållberg announced that he would leave Färjestad after the season and that he had signed with the Swiss club EV Zug. That meant that this was maybe his last chance to win the Swedish Championship. And finally Hållberg got his gold when Färjestad defeated Frölunda HC with 4–2 in best-of-seven series. The same season Hållberg also played with the Swedish national team, and there also he won a gold medal at the World Championship.

Hållberg then went over to Modo Hockey in 2007 to play there for four seasons. On June 1, 2011, Hållberg signed a one-year contract with Växjö Lakers Hockey of the Elitserien (SEL).

Achievements
 Silver medal at the World Championship in 2004.
 Swedish Champion with Färjestads BK in 2006.
 Gold medal at the World Championship in 2006.

Career statistics

References

External links

1978 births
Living people
Färjestad BK players
Modo Hockey players
Växjö Lakers players
Swedish ice hockey defencemen
Swedish expatriate sportspeople in Switzerland
People from Örnsköldsvik Municipality
Sportspeople from Västernorrland County